This is a list of the cattle breeds considered in France to be wholly or partly of French origin. Some may have complex or obscure histories, so inclusion here does not necessarily imply that a breed is predominantly or exclusively French. The list includes breeds from the overseas territories of France.

Indigenous breeds

Imported breeds
 Aurochs reconstitué
 Blanc-Bleu or Belgian Blue
 Brahman
 Canadienne
 De Combat
 Hereford
 Hérens
 Jersiaise or Jersey
 Prim' Holstein or Holstein
 Simmental Française or Pie Rouge de l'Est

References

 
Cattle